Subriel Ahmed Matías Matthew (born March 31, 1992) is a Puerto Rican professional boxer who has held the IBF junior welterweight title since February 2023. As of February 2023, he is ranked as the world’s fourth best active junior welterweight by The Ring and seventh by the Transnational Boxing Rankings Board.

Professional career

Early career

Career beginnings
Matías made his professional debut against Juan Rojas on December 19, 2015. He won the fight by a first-round technical knockout. Matías amassed an 8–0 record before taking the first step up of his career on August 18, 2018, as he faced British veteran Breidis Prescott. He won the fight by a third-round technical knockout. Prescott was twice knocked down in the third round, with a left hook and an uppercut, before retiring from the bout.

Matías faced the journeyman Wilberth López in a stay-busy fight on March 2, 2019. He won the fight by a sixth-round technical knockout. Matías would then face the undefeated Maxim Dadashev in an IBF junior welterweight title eliminator on July 19, 2019. Dadashev retired from the fight at the end of the eleventh round. He suffered a severe brain injury during the bout and passed away a few days later.

Matías faced Petros Ananyan on February 22, 2020, on the undercard of Deontay Wilder vs. Tyson Fury II. Despite entering the fight as a sizable favorite, he lost the fight by a close unanimous decision. Matías was staggered back to the ropes late in the seventh round, which referee Roberty Byrd ruled a knockdown. This proved to be the pivotal moment of the contest, as two of the judges scored the bout 95–94 for Ananyan, while the third judge gave his opponent a slightly wider scorecard of 96–93.

Rise up the ranks
Matías faced the undefeated Malik Hawkins on October 24, 2020. He won the fight by a seventh-round technical knockout. The contest was stopped a second into the round, on the advice of the ringside physician, who was previously called to check the injuries on Hawkins' face in the fifth round. All three judges had Matías up 59–54 at the time of the stoppage.

Matías faced Batyrzhan Jukembayev in an IBF junior welterweight title eliminator on May 29, 2021. Jukembayev retired from the fight at the end of the eighth round. Matías had knocked him down with a left hook in the fourth round and was up 77–74, 77–74 and 76–75 on the scorecards by the end of the final round.

Matías faced Petros Ananyan on January 22, 2022. The pair previously fought on February 22, 2020, when Ananyan was able to win by a narrow unanimous decision. He was unable to replicate his earlier success however, as he was forced to retire at the end of the tenth round, after he was knocked down with a left hook in the previous round. Matías was up 89–81 on two of the judges' scorecards at the time of the stoppage and 88–82 on the last one.

IBF junior welterweight champion

Matías vs. Ponce
On June 3, 2022, the IBF ordered Matías to face Jeremias Ponce for the interim IBF junior welterweight title. On July 7, the sanctioning body instead ordered the unified junior welterweight champion Josh Taylor to make a mandatory title defense against Ponce. Taylor refused the fight on August 24 and officially vacated the belt on that same day. The IBF immediately ordered a vacant championship bout between Matías  and Ponce. Although the fight was scheduled to take place on October 15, on the undercard of the Deontay Wilder and Robert Helenius Fox Sports pay-per-view, it was postponed as Ponce was unable to secure a visa in time for the fight. The title bout was re-scheduled for February 11, 2023, before being postponed to February 25. It took place at the Armory in Minneapolis, Minnesota and headlined a Showtime broadcast card. Matías won the fight by a fifth-round stoppage, as Ponce's corner decided to retire their fighter at the end of the round. The newly crowned champion was up on the scorecards at the time, with all three judges having scored the bout 48–46 in his favor.

Professional boxing record

See also
List of world light-welterweight boxing champions
List of Puerto Rican boxing world champions
Sports in Puerto Rico
Afro–Puerto Ricans

References

External links

Subriel Matias - Profile, News Archive & Current Rankings at Box.Live

 

|-

1992 births
Living people
Puerto Rican male boxers
People from Fajardo, Puerto Rico
Puerto Rican people of Dominican Republic descent
World light-welterweight boxing champions
International Boxing Federation champions